The 2012–13 Baltic Basketball League was the 9th season of the Baltic Basketball League.

The Challenge Cup tournament was discontinued and the new format featured 23 teams – 9 from Lithuania, 8 from Estonia, 5 from Latvia and 1 from Kazakhstan. For the Regular season the teams were divided into three groups of six and one group of five. Top four teams of each group advanced to Last 16 where they were divided into four groups. Two best teams of each group advanced to the play-offs. All play-off games were played in home-and-away series.

Ventspils became the first ever Latvian team to win the tournament by beating Lithuanian side Prienai 161–142 on aggregate score in the finals. Kalev/Cramo from Estonia won their first Baltic League medal by downing Latvian side Barons kvartāls 144–137 in the bronze medal playoffs.

Teams

Regular season

The Regular season ran from October 1, 2012 to December 18, 2012.

If teams are level on record at the end of the Regular season, tiebreakers are applied in the following order:
 Head-to-head record.
 Head-to-head point differential.
 Point differential during the Regular season.
 Points scored during the Regular season.
 Sum of quotients of points scored and points allowed in each Regular season match.

Group A

Group B

Group C

Group D

Last 16
The Last 16 phase ran from January 8, 2013 to February 26, 2013.

If teams are level on record at the end of the Last 16 phase, tiebreakers are applied in the following order:
 Head-to-head record.
 Head-to-head point differential.
 Point differential during the Last 16 phase.
 Points scored during the Last 16 phase.
 Sum of quotients of points scored and points allowed in each Last 16 phase match.

Group E

Group F

Group G

Group H

Play-offs

In the knockout phase rounds will be played in a home-and-away format, with the overall cumulative score determining the winner of a round. Thus, the score of one single game can be tied.

Bracket

Finals

Game 1

Game 2

Individual statistics
Players qualify to this category by having at least 50% games played. Statistics include only Regular Season games.
Source: Baltic Basketball League player statistics

Efficiency

Points

Rebounds

Assists

Awards

BBL 2012–13 Season MVP
  Gediminas Orelik (Prienai)

BBL 2013 Finals MVP
  Jānis Timma (Ventspils)

Top Scorer
  Māris Gulbis (Barons kvartāls)

MVP of the Month
{| class="wikitable" style="text-align: center;"
! align="center"|Month
! align="center" width=170|Player
! align="center" width=170|Team
! align="center" width=|Ref.
|-
|October 2012||align="left"| Darrick Leonard||align="left"| Juventus || 
|-
|November 2012||align="left"| Reimo Tamm||align="left"| Rakvere Tarvas || 
|-
|December 2012||align="left"| Māris Gulbis ||align="left"| Barons kvartāls || 
|-
|January 2013||align="left"| Jānis Bērziņš ||align="left"| Valmiera || 
|-
|February 2013||align="left"| Brandis Raley-Ross ||align="left"| Rakvere Tarvas ||

References

External links
 

Baltic Basketball League seasons
2012–13 in European basketball leagues
2012–13 in Lithuanian basketball
2012–13 in Estonian basketball
2012–13 in Latvian basketball
2012–13 in Kazakhstani basketball